Carpentaria was a Legislative Assembly electorate in the state of Queensland, Australia.

History
Carpentaria was created by the Electoral Districts Act of 1887, taking effect at the 1888 elections. It was based in far northern Queensland.

Carpentaria was abolished at the 1912 elections, split into Electoral district of Burke and Electoral district of Cook.
Carpentaria was recreated at the 1932 elections, replacing Flinders.

Members

The following people were elected in the seat of Carpentaria:

Election results

See also
 Electoral districts of Queensland
 Members of the Queensland Legislative Assembly by year
 :Category:Members of the Queensland Legislative Assembly by name

References

Former electoral districts of Queensland
1888 establishments in Australia
1912 disestablishments in Australia
1932 establishments in Australia
1960 disestablishments in Australia
Constituencies established in 1888
Constituencies established in 1932
Constituencies disestablished in 1912
Constituencies disestablished in 1960